Elias Boudinot Caldwell (April 3, 1776 – May 30, 1825) was a Clerk of the Supreme Court of the United States.

Born in Elizabethtown, New Jersey, Caldwell was two-years-old when his mother, Hannah, was killed by British troops passing through their farm. A short time later in 1781 Reverend James Caldwell, his father, was murdered and Caldwell was adopted by Elias Boudinot, for whom he was named. Caldwell graduated from the College of New Jersey (now Princeton University) and studied law with the said Elias Boudinot until his move to the District of Columbia.

Caldwell worked as a lawyer in Washington, D.C alongside Francis Scott Key for a number of years. Both men were organizing members of the American Society for Colonizing the Free People of Color in the United States. Caldwell was the organization's secretary, and Key was on the board of managers. According to David Walker (abolitionist), Caldwell stated during the organization's founding, in reference to enslaved Americans: "The more you improve the condition of these people, the more you cultivate their minds, the more miserable you make them in their present state. You give them a higher relish for those privileges which they can never attain, and turn what we intend for a blessing into a curse."

At the age of twenty-four, in 1800, Caldwell was appointed clerk of the Supreme Court at Washington and held this post until his death in 1825.

Sources

References 

1776 births
1825 deaths
Clerks of the Supreme Court of the United States
People from Elizabeth, New Jersey
Princeton University alumni
People of colonial New Jersey